The Northern Province (commonly referred to as Northern Sierra Leone or simply the North) is one of the five provincial divisions of Sierra Leone. It is located in the Northern geographic region of Sierra Leone. It comprises the following four Districts: Bombali, Falaba, Koinadugu and Tonkolili. Its administrative and economic center is Makeni. The North borders the Western Area to the West, the Republic of Guinea to the north-east, the Eastern Province and Southern Province to the south-east.

Geography

Overview

The Northern province is mainly a hilly wooded area with mountainous area farther inland. The region has ranges of Mountains, Hills, Valleys and Wetlands; comprising unique and endangered species. The region is a political stronghold of the All People's Congress (APC) political party. The APC currently controls all the elected seats from the North virtually.

Districts
The four districts of the Northern Province.
Bombali District, capital Makeni
Koinadugu District, capital Kabala
Falaba District, capital Mongo
Tonkolili District, capital Magburaka

Prior to 2018, the province also included
Port Loko District, capital Port Loko
Kambia District, capital Kambia
Areas of Bombali district which now make up Karene District

Borders
The Northern Province has the following borders:

Mamou Region, Guinea: north
Faranah Region, Guinea: northeast
Nzérékoré Region, Guinea: far east
North West Province: west
Western Area: southwest
Eastern Province: south
Southern Province: far southwest.

Outamba-Kilimi National Park
One of the main tourist attraction in the North is the Outamba-Kilimi National Park. The park is one of the most well-known and frequently visited sites in Sierra Leone.  The Park is found in the northeastern of Kamakwie in the Bombali District. It is a magical place embedded between two rivers, the Great Scarcies, and the Mongo Rivers. At the park are rare elephants and buffaloes frequently seen following their paths through the dense bush. See the Hippos relaxing in their pools or listen to the songs of the rich bird life and the alarm calls of the various primates while silently paddling along the river in a canoe.

Ethnic groups
The Temne people are the largest ethnic group in Northern Sierra Leone. The Temne form the largest ethnic group in every districts in the north, except Koinadugu District.  Other ethnic groups in Northern Sierra Leone with significant population are the Limba, Kuranko, Mandingo, Loko, the Fula, and Yalunka.

Religion

See also
Subdivisions of Sierra Leone

References

External links

 
Provinces of Sierra Leone